Paul Leinster  is Professor of Environmental Assessment in the Centre for Environment and Agricultural Informatics at Cranfield University. In 2008 he was awarded the CBE.

Career
Leinster graduated from Imperial College London where he also was awarded a Ph.D. in 1977. He had a working  career involving posts at BP and Smith Kline Beecham before joining the Environment Agency as Director of Operations in 1998, later becoming its Chief Executive in 2008.

He joined Cranfield University in 2015 and is also chair of bpha  a housing association in Bedford covering the geographical area between Oxford and Cambridge.

References

Commanders of the Order of the British Empire
People associated with Cranfield University
Year of birth missing (living people)
Living people